flyeralarm Arena is a football stadium in Würzburg, Germany. Würzburger Kickers use this stadium for their home games.

History 
The stadium was opened in 1967 and renamed to flyeralarm Arena due to sponsorship reasons in 2013. It has been equipped with floodlights in 2014 in order to meet the requirements for the club's DFB-Pokal appearance.

Facilities 
The whole stadium complex consists of two grass fields and one artificial field.

References

External links 
 Visitor guide with pictures and directions at GermanFootballGrounds.com

Football venues in Germany
Würzburger Kickers
Sports venues in Bavaria
Sports venues completed in 1967